Northern Ireland was represented at the 2010 Commonwealth Games by the Commonwealth Games Council for Northern Ireland. The team went by the abbreviation NIR and used the Ulster Banner as its flag and Londonderry Air as the victory anthem.

Medalists

Team Northern Ireland at the 2010 Commonwealth Games

Team Northern Ireland for the 2010 Commonwealth Games was confirmed on 10 September 2010, the team members are as follows:

Aquatics

Swimming

Team Northern Ireland consists of 10 swimmers.

Melanie Nocher, Andrew Bree, Ryan Harrison, Conor Leaney, Bethany Carson, Michael Dawson, Chelsey Wilson, Clare Dawson, Sycerika McMahon, Laurence McGivern.

Archery

Team Northern Ireland consists of 7 archers.

Emma Parker, Robert Hall, Stuart Wilson, Darrel Wilson, Mark Nesbitt, Ian McGibbon, Karl Watson.

Athletics

Team Northern Ireland consists of 10 athletes.

Ciara Mageean, Kelly McNeice, Amy Foster, Tom Reynolds, Stephen Scullion, James McIlroy, Joanna Mills, Jo Patterson, Katie Kirk, Christine McMahon.

Badminton

Team Northern Ireland consists of 4 badminton players.

Emma Callow, Matthew Gleave, Sinead Chambers, Tony Stephenson.

Team Event

Boxing

Team Northern Ireland consists of 9 boxers.

Men

Cycling

Team Northern Ireland consists of:

Wendy Houvenaghel, David McCann, Michael Hutchinson,  Philip Lavery, Heather Carson, Martyn Irvine, Adam Armstrong, Sean Downey.

Northern Ireland won the bronze medal in the 4000 m men's team pursuit race.

Gymnastics

Team Northern Ireland consists of 3 gymnasts.

Luke Carson, Charlotte McKenna, Seriena Johnrose.

Lawn Bowls

Team Northern Ireland consists of 11 lawn bowls players.

Barbara Logue, Jennifer Dowds, Donna McCloy, Mandy Cunningham, Sandra Bailie, Gary Kelly, Ian McClure, Gary McCloy, Paul Daly, Martin McHugh, Neil Booth.

Shooting

Team Northern Ireland consists of 11 shooters.

David Calvert, David Beattie, Kirsty Barr, Robert Doak, Gary Duff, Matthew Hall, Louise Aiken, Mervyn Morrison, Debbie Bader, Hugh Stewart, Ross McGuillan.

Squash

Team Northern Ireland consists of 2 squash players.

Madeline Perry, Zoe Barr.

Table Tennis

Team Northern Ireland consists of 5 table tennis players.

Na Liu, Amanda Mogey, Ashley Given, Paul McCreery, Claire Nelson.

Wrestling

Team Northern Ireland consists of 1 wrestler.

Men – Freestyle

See also
 Northern Ireland at the 2006 Commonwealth Games

References

External links
 Northern Ireland Commonwealth Games Council

Nations at the 2010 Commonwealth Games
Northern Ireland at the Commonwealth Games
Comm